Odell Haggins Jr. (born February 27, 1967) is an American football coach and former player. He is the associate head football coach and defensive tackles coach at Florida State University. Haggins has coached at Florida State since 1994 and has served two stints as interim head coach, for the final two games on the 2017 season, following the resignation of Jimbo Fisher, and the final four games of the 2019 season, after the firing of Willie Taggart.

Career
Haggins has been on the Florida State Seminoles coaching staff since 1994, nearly all of it spent coaching the defensive tackle position. Haggins has also served as associate head coach since 2014, and has twice been named interim head coach. He led the Seminoles for the final two games of the 2017 season and the final four games of the 2019 season (both including bowl games).

A native of Bartow, Florida, Haggins was an All-American defensive lineman for the Seminoles. He played for Florida State from 1985 to 1989 under Bobby Bowden.

Haggins was selected by the San Francisco 49ers in the ninth round, 248th overall, of the 1990 NFL Draft. After three years in the NFL with the 49ers and the Bills, Haggins returned to Florida State as tight ends and offensive line coach under Bowden. He remained on the staff of Bowden's successor, Jimbo Fisher, when he became head coach for the 2010 season. In 2014, Haggins was promoted to associate head coach.

In 2017, Haggins went 2–0 as interim head coach when Fisher resigned, leading the Seminoles into bowl eligibility with a win in their final regular-season game, followed by a 42–13 win over Southern Miss in the 2017 Independence Bowl.

Haggins was again retained by new coach Willie Taggart when he was hired for the 2018 season. When Taggart was fired midway through the 2019 season, Haggins was again named interim coach for the final 3 regular season games; the team went 2–1 during that stretch, bringing its overall season record to 6–6 and again reaching a bowl game.

In December 2019, new FSU head coach Mike Norvell announced Haggins would be the first assistant coach hired to join his staff. The 2020 season will be his 27th as assistant coach at FSU, making him the longest-tenured assistant coach in the country. Norvell will be the fourth head coach to employ Haggins on the FSU staff.

In 2018, Haggins was selected for the FSU Athletics Hall of Fame.

Head coaching record

*Haggins served as interim coach after Jimbo Fisher left for Texas A&M on December 1, 2017.
**Haggins served as interim coach after Willie Taggart was fired on November 3, 2019.

References

External links
 Florida State profile
 

1967 births
Living people
American football defensive tackles
Buffalo Bills players
Florida State Seminoles football coaches
Florida State Seminoles football players
San Francisco 49ers players
Sportspeople from Bartow, Florida
Sportspeople from Lakeland, Florida
Coaches of American football from Florida
Players of American football from Florida
African-American coaches of American football
African-American players of American football
20th-century African-American sportspeople
21st-century African-American sportspeople